The Rugby Regionalliga is the third-highest level of Germany's Rugby union league system, organised by the German Rugby Federation. It is set below the 2nd Rugby-Bundesliga and is organised in eight regional divisions.

Since 2010, the Regionalliga is only the fourth level of play in Southern Germany, since the inception of the 3rd Liga South/West, which covers the same states as the 2nd Rugby-Bundesliga South/West above it except Bavaria.

History
The Regionalligas form the third tier of German rugby union since the inception of the 2nd Rugby-Bundesliga in the early 1990s. Before that, the league was the second tier, below the Rugby-Bundesliga. Below the Regionalliga sits the Rugby-Verbandsliga, however, in some regions, the Regionalliga is the lowest division and no Verbandsliga exists.

The six leagues cover the following states:
 Regionalliga North
 Bremen
 Hamburg
 Lower Saxony (northern parts)
 Mecklenburg-Vorpommern
 Schleswig-Holstein
 Regionalliga East A & B
 Berlin
 Brandenburg
 Saxony
 Saxony-Anhalt
 Thuringia
 Regionalliga West
 Hesse (northern part)
 Lower Saxony (southern parts)
 Luxembourg
 North Rhine-Westphalia
 Rhineland-Palatinate
 Saarland
 Regionalliga Hesse
 Hesse (except most northern part)
 Regionalliga Baden-Württemberg
 Baden-Württemberg
 Regionalliga Bavaria
 Bavaria
 Baden-Württemberg (Ulm region)
 Austria ''(Innsbruck)

The champions of the different league divisions, as well as league champions play-off at the end of the season for 2nd Bundesliga promotion. The champions of the RL West and RL Hesse determine the promoted team for the 2. Bundesliga West, RL Baden-Württemberg and RL Bavaria determine the promoted team to the 2. Bundesliga South, whereas RL North and RL East determine the promoted team to the 2. Bundesliga North and East respectively.

Clubs participating in 2018-19

Champions

Northern Germany

 Until 2002, North Rhine-Westphalia played a separate spring and autumn championship.
 In 2004, 2005, 2006 and 2007, Lower Saxony and East played a combined North/East championship in spring.
 Until 2001 and from 2007 to 2009, Lower Saxony played a separate spring and autumn championship.
 From 2010-11 onwards no separate Regionalliga North was played.

Southern Germany

 In 2006-07, RC Mainz competed in both Hesse and Rhineland-Palatinate.
 In 2005-06, Hesse and Rhineland-Palatinate played a combined championship.
 Until 2001, Bavaria played a separate spring and autumn championship.
 Until 2001, Rhineland-Palatinate played a separate spring and autumn championship.
 For the 2018-20 season, Rhineland-Palatinate formed a 3 pool competition Rheinland / Westfalen / Rheinland-Pfalz&Luxemburg with the addition of RC Walferdange (Luxemburg) - the second team from that country to join the Germany National competition after RC Luxemburg with a 1st and 2nd XV.

Placings

North
The league placings in the Regionalliga North:

 1 Combined team of VfL Jesteburg and VfL Geesthacht.
 2 Welfen Braunschweig played in the Regionalliga Lower Saxony until 2009.
 3 Hamburger RC also played in the North/East championship in spring 2006.

Lower Saxony
The league placings in the Regionalliga Lower Saxony. The league has been defunct since the end of the 2009–10 season:

 Until 2001, the league was played in an autumn (A) and a spring (S) championship, with the autumn champion receiving the opportunity to play in the 2nd Rugby-Bundesliga North/East qualification round in spring. From 2003 to 2009, the league was once more divided into autumn and spring. From 2004 to 2007, a North/East championship was played in spring. Since 2010, the clubs from Lower Saxony play in the Regionalliga North and no Regionalliga Lower Saxony exists.
 1 Combined reserves team of SV Odin Hannover and VfR Döhren.
 2 Combined reserves team of DSV 78 Hannover and SV 08 Ricklingen.
 3 Played in the Regionalliga North in 2009-10.
 4 Combined team of FC Schwalbe Hannover and the reserve team of DRC Hannover.
 5 Combined reserves team of TSV Victoria Linden and DSV 78 Hannover.
 6 Combined reserves team of FC Schwalbe Hannover and VfR Döhren.
 7 Hamburger RC also played in the Regionalliga North championship in 2005-06.

East
The league placings in the Regionalliga East:

 Until 2007 and again in 2009-10, the league was played in an autumn (A) and a spring (S) championship, with the autumn champion, until 2001, receiving the opportunity to play in the 2nd Rugby-Bundesliga North/East qualification round in spring.
 In 2003-04, the league was divided into a northern and a southern group, which played in autumn. The top two teams from the north and the best team from the south then played in the North/East championship in spring. The remaining top teams in each group then played in placings round 1 while the bottom teams played in round 2.
 From 2004-05 to 2006-07, the league was played in an A and a B division in autumn. The best teams from the A division then played in the North/East championship in spring. The remaining teams from the A division and the winner of B then played in the placings round 1. The worst team in the A group and the rest of B played in round 2.
 In 2007-08 and 2008–09, an A and a B division existed with a standard home-and-away season and no separate autumn and spring rounds.
 In 2009-10, all clubs in the East played a single autumn round in one division. The top five then played in the A division in spring while the bottom six played in the B division.
 1 Combined team of the reserve side of RU Hohen Neuendorf and Stahl Hennigsdorf Rugby.
 2 Combined team of the reserve side of RV Dresden and Sachsen-Anhalter SV.
 3 Combined team of the reserve side of USV Potsdam Rugby and Berlin Grizzlies.

North Rhine-Westphalia
The league placings in the Regionalliga North Rhine-Westphalia:

 Until 2002, the league was played in an autumn (A) and a spring (S) championship, with the autumn champion, until 2001, receiving the opportunity to play in the 2nd Rugby-Bundesliga South/West qualification round in spring. Since the 2013–14 season the league has been split into a Rhineland and Westphalia division.
 1 Combined team of Brühler TV and RC Hürth.
 2 Combined team of WMTV Solingen and SVD Sundwig.

Rhineland-Palatinate
The league placings in the Regionalliga Rhineland-Palatinate. The league has been defunct since the end of the 2013–14 season:

 Until 2001, the league was played in an autumn (A) and a spring (S) championship, with the autumn champion receiving the opportunity to play in the 2nd Rugby-Bundesliga South/West qualification round in spring.
 1 Combined team of FSV Trier-Tarforst and DJK Andernach.
 2 Combined team of RC Worms and a team from Speyer.
 3 In 2006-07, RC Mainz took part in both the Regionalliga Hesse and Regionalliga Rhineland-Palatinate.
 4 In 2005-06, the Regionalliga Hesse and Regionalliga Rhineland-Palatinate played as a joined league. SC 1880 Frankfurt II, Eintracht Frankfurt Rugby, RU Marburg, Blau-Gelb Darmstadt and URC Gießen 01 are clubs from Hesse.
 5 In 2003-04, RC Worms took part in both the Regionalliga Hesse and Regionalliga Rhineland-Palatinate.
 6 Combined team of the reserve team of RC Mainz and TuS Horrweiler.

Hesse
The league placings in the Regionalliga Hesse:

 1 Combined team of RU Marburg and CRC Babenhausen.
 2 Combined team of the third team of SC 1880 Frankfurt and CRC Babenhausen.
 3 In 2006-07, RC Mainz took part in both the Regionalliga Hesse and Regionalliga Rhineland-Palatinate.
 4 In 2005-06, the Regionalliga Hesse and Regionalliga Rhineland-Palatinate played as a joined league. RC Mainz, RC Worms and the Ramstein Rogues RFC are clubs from Rhineland-Palatinate.
 5 In 2003-04, RC Worms took part in both the Regionalliga Hesse and Regionalliga Rhineland-Palatinate.
 6 Combined team of the reserve team of RK Heusenstamm and the TGS Hausen.
 7 Combined team of the reserve team of BSC Offenbach and the Blau-Gelb Darmstadt.
 8 Combined team of CRC Babenhausen and TGS Hausen.

Baden-Württemberg
The league placings in the Regionalliga Baden-Württemberg. The league has been defunct since the end of the 2011–12 season:

 Until 2001, the league was played in an autumn (A) and a spring (S) championship, with the autumn champion receiving the opportunity to play in the 2nd Rugby-Bundesliga South/West qualification round in spring. No competition has been held since 2012.
 1 Combined team of RC Konstanz and TSB Ravensburg.
 2 Combined team of RC Rottweil and the reserve team of Stuttgarter RC.
 3 Combined team of Karlsruher SV Rugby, TV Pforzheim and the reserve team of Heidelberger TV.
 4 Combined team of Karlsruher SV Rugby and TV Pforzheim.
 5 Combined team of the reserve team of SC Neuenheim and TV Pforzheim.

Bavaria
The league placings in the Regionalliga Bavaria, which was formed shortley after the Bavarian Rugby Federation in 1996:

 Until 2001, the league was played in an autumn (A) and a spring (S) championship, with the autumn champion receiving the opportunity to play in the 2nd Rugby-Bundesliga South/West qualification round in spring. As the 2000 autumn champions, München RFC II, was ineligible to compete in the 2nd Bundesliga, being a reserves team, the second placed team, TSV 1846 Nürnberg, went instead. 2015/16 München RFC II, was ineligible to compete in the 2nd Bundesliga, Unterföhring lost the promotion play-off against Karlsruher SV. In 2016/17 Nürnberg declined the promotion to the 2nd Bundesliga, so Unterföhring stepped in.

Key

See also 
Rugby union in Germany
German rugby union cup

References

External links 
German Rugby Federation website
 Scrum.de - Result archive
 Rugbyweb.de - Result archive

Rugby union leagues in Germany